This is the list of Anglican and Roman Catholic cathedrals in Madagascar.

Anglican 
Cathedrals of the Anglican Church in Madagascar, also known as the Eklesia Episkopaly Malagasy (Episcopal Church of Madagascar in English):

Cathedral of Saint Lawrence (Santa Laurent) in Ambohimanoro, Antananarivo
Cathedral of Saint James (Santa Jakoba) in Toamasina
Cathedral of Saint Matthew (Santa Matio) in Antsiranana
Cathedral of Saint Luke (Santa Lioka) in Mahajanga
Cathedral of Saint Patrick (Santa Patrika) in Andranomena, Toliara
Cathedral of Saint Mark (Santa Marka) in Fianarantsoa

Roman Catholic
Cathedrals of the Roman Catholic Church in Madagascar:

 Cathedral of the Immaculate Heart of Mary in Ambositra
 Cathedral of the Immaculate Conception in Andohalo, Antananarivo
 Cathedral of Christ the King in Miarinarivo
 Cathedral of Our Lady of Good Remedy in Tsiroanomandidy
 Cathedral of Our Lady of La Salette in Antsirabe
 Cathedral of St. Matthew in Antsiranana
 Cathedral of St. Joseph in Ambanja
 Cathedral of the Sacred Heart of Jesus in Farafangana
 Cathedral of the Holy Name of Jesus in Fianarantsoa
 Cathedral of St. Vincent de Paul in Ihosy
 Cathedral of St. Augustine in Mananjary
 Cathedral of the Holy Trinity in Ambatondrazaka
 Cathedral of the Sacred Heart of Jesus in Moramanga
 Cathedral of the Sacred Heart of Jesus in Morombe
 Cathedral of Our Lady of the Assumption in Boriziny
 Cathedral of the Holy Heart of Mary in Mahajanga
 Cathedral of St. Joseph in Toamasina
 Cathedral of St. Maurice in Fenoarivo Atsinanana
 Cathedral of Toliara
 Cathedral of Mary Queen of the World in Morondava
 Cathedral of St. Vincent de Paul in Taolanaro

See also

List of cathedrals
Eastern Orthodoxy in Madagascar

References

Madagascar
Cathedrals
Cathedrals
Anglican cathedrals in Madagascar
Cathedrals